Hasse Greis Persson (born 16 August 1942) is a Danish sports shooter. He competed in the men's 50 metre rifle, prone event at the 1976 Summer Olympics.

References

External links
 
 

1942 births
Living people
Danish male sport shooters
Olympic shooters of Denmark
Shooters at the 1976 Summer Olympics
Sportspeople from Copenhagen